These are the Billboard R&B singles chart number-one singles of 2004.

Chart history

See also
2004 in music
List of number-one R&B hits (United States)

References

2004
United States RandB Songs
2004 in American music